The men's individual compound archery competition at the 2022 World Games took place from 8 to 9 July 2022 at the Avondale Park Historic District in Birmingham, United States.

Competition format
A total of 25 athletes entered the competition. Ranking round was held to determine seeding. Athletes competed in single-elimination tournament.

Results

Ranking round

Competition bracket

References 

Men's individual compound